Qizilbash or Kizilbash were a diverse array of mainly Turkoman Shia militant groups that flourished in Azerbaijan, Anatolia, the Armenian highlands, the Caucasus, and Kurdistan from the late 15th century onwards, and contributed to the foundation of the Safavid dynasty of Iran.

Etymology

The word Qizilbash derives from Turkish Kızılbaş, meaning "red head". The expression is derived from their distinctive twelve-gored crimson headwear (tāj or tark in Persian; sometimes specifically titled "Haydar's Crown"   / Tāj-e Ḥaydar), indicating their adherence to the Twelve Imams and to Shaykh Haydar, the spiritual leader (sheikh) of the Safavid order in accordance with the Imamate in Twelver doctrine. The name was originally a pejorative label given to them by their Sunni Ottoman foes, but soon it was adopted as a mark of pride.

Origins
The origin of the Qizilbash can be dated from the 15th century onward, when the spiritual grandmaster of the movement, Shaykh Haydar (the head of the Safaviyya Sufi order), organized his followers into militant troops. The Qizilbash were originally composed of seven Turkic, all Azerbaijani-speaking tribes: Rumlu, Shamlu, Ustajlu, Afshar, Qajar, Tekelu, and Zulkadar.

Connections between the Qizilbash and other religious groups and secret societies, such as the Iranian Zoroastrian Mazdaki movement in the Sasanian Empire, or its more radical offspring, the Persian Khurramites, and Turkish shamanism, have been suggested. Of these, the Khurramites were, like the Qizilbash, an early Shi'i ghulat group and dressed in red, for which they were termed "the red ones" (muḥammirah) by medieval sources. In this context, Turkish scholar Abdülbaki Gölpinarlı sees the Qizilbash as "spiritual descendants of the Khurramites".

Organization
The Qizilbash were a coalition of many different tribes of predominantly (but not exclusively) Turkic-speaking background united in their adherence to Safavi Shia Islam.

As murids (sworn students) of the Safavi sheikhs (pirs), the Qizilbash owed implicit obedience to their leader in his capacity as their murshid-e kāmil "supreme spiritual director" and, after the establishment of the kingdom, as their padishah (great king). The establishment of the kingdom thus changed the purely religious pir – murid relationship into a political one. As a consequence, any act of disobedience of the Qizilbash Sufis against the order of the spiritual grandmaster (Persian: nāsufigari "conduct unbecoming of a Sufi") became "an act of treason against the king and a crime against the state", as was the case in 1614 when Padishah Abbas the Great put some followers to death.

Beliefs

The Qizilbash adhered to heterodox Shi’i doctrines encouraged by the early Safavi sheikhs Haydar and his son Ismail I. They regarded their rulers as divine figures, and so were classified as ghulat "extremists" by orthodox Twelvers.

When Tabriz was taken, there was not a single book on Twelverism among the Qizilbash leaders. The book of the well known Iraqi scholar al-Hilli (1250–1325) was procured in the town library to provide religious guidance to the state. The imported Shi'i ulama did not participate in the formation of Safavid religious policies during the early formation of the state. However, ghulat doctrines were later forsaken and Arab Twelver ulama from Lebanon, Iraq, and Bahrain were imported in increasing numbers to bolster orthodox Twelver practice and belief.

Qizilbash aqidah in Anatolia

In Turkey, orthoprax Twelvers following Ja'fari jurisprudence are called Ja'faris. Although the Qizilbash are also Twelvers, their practices do not adhere to Ja'fari jurisprudence.
 The Qizilbash have a unique and complex conviction tracing back to the Kaysanites and Khurramites, who are considered ghulat (extremist) Shia. According to Turkish scholar , the Qizilbash of the 16th century – a religious and political movement in Iranian Azerbaijan that helped to establish the Safavid dynasty – were "spiritual descendants of the Khurramites".
 Among the individual revered by Alevis, two figures, firstly Abu Muslim who assisted the Abbasid Caliphate to beat Umayyad Caliphate, but who was later eliminated and murdered by Caliph al-Mansur, and secondly Babak Khorramdin, who incited a rebellion against the Abbasid Caliphate and consequently was killed by Caliph al-Mu'tasim, are highly respected. In addition, the Safavid leader Ismail I is highly regarded.
 The Qizilbash aqidah, or creed,  is based upon a syncretic fiqh (jurisprudence tradition) called batiniyya, referring to an inner or hidden meaning in holy texts. It incorporates some Qarmatian thoughts, originally introduced by Abu’l-Khāttāb Muhammad ibn Abu Zaynab al-Asadī, and later developed by Maymun al-Qāddāh and his son ʿAbd Allāh ibn Maymun, and Muʿtazila with a strong belief in The Twelve Imams.
 Not all of the members believe that the fasting in Ramadan is obligatory although some Alevi Turks perform their fasting duties partially in Ramadan.
 Some beliefs of shamanism still are common among the Qizilbash in villages.
 The Qizilbash are not a part of Ja'fari jurisprudence, even though they can be considered as members of different tariqa of Shia Islam all looks like sub-classes of Twelver. Their conviction includes Batiniyya-Hurufism and "Sevener-Qarmatians-Isma'ilism" sentiments.
 They all may be considered as special groups not following the Ja'fari jurisprudence, like Alawites who are in the class of ghulat Twelver Shia Islam, but a special Batiniyya belief somewhat similar to Isma'ilism in their conviction.

Composition

Among the Qizilbash, Turcoman tribes from Eastern Anatolia and Iranian Azerbaijan who had helped Ismail I defeat the Aq Qoyunlu tribe were by far the most important in both number and influence and the name Qizilbash is usually applied exclusively to them. Some of these greater Turcoman tribes were subdivided into as many as eight or nine clans, including:
 Ustādjlu (Their origins reach back to the Begdili)
 Rūmlu
 Shāmlu (the most powerful clan during the reign of Shah Ismail I.)
 Dulkadir (Arabic: Dhu 'l-Kadar)
 Afshār
 Qājār
 Takkalu

Other tribes – such as the Turkman, Bahārlu, Qaramānlu, Warsāk, and Bayāt – were occasionally listed among these "seven great uymaqs". Today, the remnants of the Qizilbash confederacy are found among the Afshar, the Qashqai, Turkmen, Shahsevan, and others.

Some of these names consist of a place-name with the addition of the Turkish suffix -lu, such as Shāmlu or Bahārlu. Other names are those of old Oghuz tribes such as the Afshār, Dulghadir, or Bayāt, as mentioned by the medieval Karakhanid historian Mahmud al-Kashgari.

The non-Turkic Iranian tribes among the Qizilbash were called Tājīks by the Turcomans and included:
 Tālish
 The Lurs
 Siāh-Kuh (Karādja-Dagh)
 certain Kurdish tribes
 certain Persian families and clans

The rivalry between the Turkic clans and the Persian nobles was a major problem in the Safavid kingdom. As V. Minorsky put it, friction between these two groups was inevitable, because the Turcomans "were no party to the national Persian tradition". Shah Ismail tried to solve the problem by appointing Persian wakils as commanders of Qizilbash tribes. The Turcomans considered this an insult and brought about the death of 3 of the 5 Persians appointed to this office – an act that later inspired the deprivation of the Turcomans by Shah Abbas I.

History

Beginnings

The rise of the Ottomans put a great strain on the Turkmen tribes living in the area, which eventually led them to join the Safavids, who transformed them into a militant organisation, called the Qizilbash (meaning "red heads" in Turkish), initially a pejorative label given to them by the Ottomans, but later adopted as a mark of pride. The religion of the Qizilbash resembled much more the heterodox beliefs of northwestern Iran and eastern Anatolia, rather than the traditional Twelver Shia Islam. The beliefs of the Qizilbash consisted of non-Islamic aspects, varying from crypto-Zoroastrian beliefs to shamanistic practises, the latter which had been practised by their Central Asian ancestors.

However, a common aspect that all these heterodox beliefs shared was a form of messianism, devoid of the restrictions of the Islam practiced in urban areas. Concepts of divine inspiration and reincarnation were common, with the Qizilbash viewing their Safavid leader (whom they called morshed-e kamel, "the Perfect Guide") as the reincarnation of Ali and a  manifestation of the divine in human form. The were a total of seven major Qizilbash "tribes", each named after an area they identified themselves with; the Rumlu presumably came from Rum (Anatolia); the Shamlu from Sham (Syria); the Takkalu from the Takkeh in southeastern Anatolia; the Ostajlu from Ostaj in the southern Caucasus. It is uncertain if the Afshar and Qajar were named after an area in Azerbaijan, or after their ancestors. All these tribes shared a common lifestyle, language, faith, and animosity towards the Ottomans.

In the 15th century, Ardabil was the center of an organization designed to keep the Safavi leadership in close touch with its murids in Azerbaijan, Iraq, Eastern Anatolia, and elsewhere. The organization was controlled through the office of khalīfāt al-khulafā'ī who appointed representatives (khalīfa) in regions where Safavi propaganda was active. The khalīfa, in turn, had subordinates termed pira. The Safavi presence in eastern Anatolia posed a serious threat to the Ottoman Empire because they encouraged the Shi'i population of Asia Minor to revolt against the sultan.

In 1499, Ismail, the young leader of the Safavi order, left Lahijan for Ardabil to make a bid for power. By the summer of 1500, about 7,000 supporters from the local Turcoman tribes of Asia Minor (Anatolia), Syria, and the Caucasus – collectively called "Qizilbash" by their enemies – rallied to his support in Erzincan. Leading his troops on a punitive campaign against the Shīrvanshāh (ruler of Shirvan), he sought revenge for the death of his father and his grandfather in Shīrvan. After defeating the Shīrvanshāh Farrukh Yassar and incorporating his kingdom, he moved south into Azarbaijan, where his 7,000 Qizilbash warriors defeated a force of 30,000 Aq Qoyunlu under Alwand Mirzā and conquered Tabriz. This was the beginning of the Safavid state.

By 1510, Ismail and his Qizilbash had conquered the whole of Iran and the Republic of Azerbaijan, southern Dagestan (with its important city of Derbent), Mesopotamia, Armenia, Khorasan, Eastern Anatolia, and had made the Georgian kingdoms of Kartli and Kakheti his vassals. Many of these areas were priorly under the control of the Ak Koyunlu.

In 1510 Shah Ismail sent a large force of the Qizilbash to Transoxiania to fight the Uzbeks. The Qizilbash defeated the Uzbeks and secured Samarkand at the Battle of Marv. However, in 1512, an entire Qizilbash army was annihilated by the Uzbeks after Turcoman Qizilbash had mutinied against their Persian wakil and commander Najm-e Thani at the Battle of Ghazdewan. This defeat put an end to Safavid expansion and influence in Transoxania and left the northeastern frontiers of the kingdom vulnerable to nomad invasions, until some decades later.

Battle of Chaldiran

Meanwhile, the Safavid dawah continued in Ottoman areas – with great success. Even more alarming for the Ottomans was the successful conversion of Turcoman tribes in Eastern Anatolia, and the recruitment of these well experienced and feared fighters into the growing Safavid army. In order to stop the Safavid propaganda, Sultan Bayezid II deported large numbers of the Shi'i population of Asia Minor to Morea. However, in 1507, Shah Ismail and the Qizilbash overran large areas of Kurdistan, defeating regional Ottoman forces. Only two years later in Central Asia, the Qizilbash defeated the Uzbeks at Merv, killing their leader Muhammad Shaybani and destroying his dynasty. His head was sent to the Ottoman sultan as a warning.

In 1511, a pro-Safavid revolt known as the Shahkulu Uprising broke out in Teke. An imperial army that was sent to suppress it, was defeated. Shah Ismail sought to turn the chaos within the Ottoman Empire to his advantage and moved up his borders even more westwards in Asia Minor. The Qizilbash defeated a large Ottoman army under Sinan Pasha. Shocked by this heavy defeat, Sultan Selim I (the new ruler of the Empire) decided to invade Persia with a force of 200,000 Ottomans and face the Qizilbash on their own soil. In addition, he ordered the persecution of Alevis and massacred its adherents in the Ottoman Empire.

On 20 August 1514 (1st Rajab 920 A.H.), the two armies met at Chaldiran in northwestern Iran. The Ottomans -equipped with both firearms and cannon- were reported to outnumber the Qizilbash as much as three to one. The Qizilbash were badly defeated; casualties included many high-ranking Qizilbash amirs as well as three influential ulamā.

The defeat destroyed Shah Ismail's belief in his own invincibility and divine status. It also fundamentally altered the relationship between the murshid-e kāmil and his murids (followers).

The deprivation of the Turcomans
Ismail I tried to reduce the power of the Turcomans by appointing Iranians to the vakil office. However, the Turcomans did not like having an Iranian to the most powerful office of the Safavid Empire and kept murdering many Iranians who were appointed to that office. After the death of Ismail, the Turkomans managed to seize power from the Iranians, they were however, defeated by Tahmasp I, the son of Ismail.

For almost ten years after the Battle of Chaldiran, rival Qizilbash factions fought for control of the kingdom. In 1524, 10-year-old Shah Tahmasp I, the governor of Herat, succeeded his father Ismail. He was the ward of the powerful Qizilbash amir Ali Beg Rūmlū (titled "Div Soltān) who was the de facto ruler of the Safavid kingdom. However, Tahmasp managed to reassert his authority over the state and over the Qizilbash.

During the reign of Shah Tahmasp, the Qizilbash fought a series of wars on two fronts and – with the poor resources available to them – successfully defended their kingdom against the Uzbeks in the east, and against the arch-rivals of the Safavids – the Ottomans – in the west. With the Peace of Amasya (1555), peace between Safavids and Ottomans remained for the rest of Tahmasp's reign.
During Tahmasp' reign, he carried out multiple invasions in the Caucasus which had been incorporated in the Safavid empire since Shah Ismail I and for many centuries afterward, and started with the trend of deporting and moving hundreds of thousands of Circassians, Georgians, and Armenians to Iran's heartlands. Initially only solely put in the royal harems, royal guards, and several other specific posts of the Empire, Tahmasp believed he could eventually reduce the power of the Qizilbash, by creating and fully integrating a new layer in Iranian society with these Caucasian elements and who would question the power and hegemony of the tribal Qizilbash. This included the formation of a military slave system, similar to that of the neighboring Ottoman Empire – the janissaries. Tahmasp's successors, and most importantly Shah Abbas I (r. 1588–1629), would significantly expand this policy when during the reign of Abbas I alone some 200,000 Georgians, 300,000 Armenians and many tens of thousands of Circassians were relocated to Iran's heartlands. By this creation of a so-called "third layer" or "third force" in Iranian society composed of ethnic Caucasians, and the complete systematic disorganisation of the Qizilbash by his personal orders, Abbas I eventually fully succeeded in replacing the power of the Qizilbash, with that of the Caucasian ghulams. These new Caucasian elements (the so-called ghilman / غِلْمَان / "servants"), almost always after conversion to Shi'ism depending on given function would be, unlike the Qizilbash, fully loyal only to the Shah. This system of mass usage of Caucasian subjects continued to exist until the fall of the Qajar dynasty.

The inter-tribal rivalry of the Turcomans, the attempt of Persian nobles to end the Turcoman dominance, and constant succession conflicts went on for another 10 years after Tahmasp's death. This heavily weakened the Safavid state and made the kingdom vulnerable to external enemies: the Ottomans attacked in the west, whereas the Uzbeks attacked the east.

In 1588, Shah Abbas I came to power. He appointed the Governor of Herat and his former guardian and tutor, Alī Quli Khān Shāmlū (also known as Hājī Alī Qizilbāsh Mazandarānī) the chief of all the armed forces. Later on, events of the past, including the role of the Turcomans in the succession struggles after the death of his father, and the counterbalancing influence of traditional Ithnāʻashari Shia Sayeds, made him determined to end the dominance of the untrustworthy Turcoman chiefs in Persia which Tahmasp had already started decades before him. In order to weaken the Turcomans – the important militant elite of the Safavid kingdom – Shah Abbas further raised a standing army, personal guard, Queen-Mothers, Harems and full civil administration from the ranks of these ghilman who were usually ethnic Circassians, Georgians, and Armenians, both men and women, whom he and his predecessors had taken captive en masse during their wars in the Caucasus, and would systematically replace the Qizilbash from their functions with converted Circassians and Georgians. The new army and civil administration would be fully loyal to the king personally and not to the clan-chiefs anymore.

The reorganisation of the army also ended the independent rule of Turcoman chiefs in the Safavid provinces, and instead centralized the administration of those provinces.

Ghulams were appointed to high positions within the royal household, and by the end of Shah Abbas' reign, one-fifth of the high-ranking amirs were ghulams. By 1598 already an ethnic Georgian from Safavid-ruled Georgia, well known by his adopted Muslim name after conversion, Allahverdi Khan, had risen to the position of commander-in-chief of all Safavid armed forces. and by that became one of the most powerful men in the empire. The offices of wakil and amir al-umarā fell in disuse and were replaced by the office of a Sipahsālār (master of the army), commander-in-chief of all armed forces – Turcoman and Non-Turcoman – and usually held by a Persian (Tādjik) noble.

The Turcoman Qizilbash nevertheless remained an important part of the Safavid executive apparatus, even though ethnic Caucasians came to largely replace them. For example, even in the 1690s, when ethnic Georgians formed the mainstay of the Safavid military, the Qizilbash still played a significant role in the army. The Afshār and Qājār rulers of Persia who succeeded the Safavids, stemmed from a Qizilbash background. Many other Qizilbash – Turcoman and Non-Turcoman – were settled in far eastern cities such as Kabul and Kandahar during the conquests of Nader Shah, and remained there as consultants to the new Afghan crown after the Shah's death. Others joined the Mughal emperors of India and became one of the most influential groups of the Mughal court until the British conquest of India.

Legacy

Afghanistan

Qizilbash in Afghanistan primarily live in urban areas, such as Kabul, Kandahar or Herat. Some of them are descendants of the troops left behind by Nadir Shah. Others however were brought to the country during the Durrani rule, Zaman Shah Durrani had a cavalry of over 100.000 men, consisting mostly of Qizilbash Afghanistan's Qizilbash held important posts in government offices in the past, and today engage in trade or are craftsmen. Since the creation of Afghanistan, they constitute an important and politically influential element of society. Estimates of their population vary from 30,000 to 200,000. They are currently Persian-speaking Shi'i Muslims.

Sir Mountstuart Elphinstone described the Qizilbash of Kabul in the beginning of the 19th century as "a colony of Turks," who spoke "Persian, and among themselves Turkish." Described as learned, affluent, and influential, they appear to have abandoned their native Turkish language in favour of Persian, and became "in fact Persianized Turks". Lady Florentia Sale (wife of Sir Robert Henry Sale) and Vincent Eyre – both companions of Sir Mountstuart Elphinstone – described the Qizilbash of Afghanistan also as "Persians, of Persian descent, or descendant of the Persians, wearing a red cap".

The influence of the Qizilbash in the government created resentment among the ruling Pashtun clans, especially after the Qizilbash openly allied themselves with the British during the First Anglo-Afghan War (1839–1842). During Abdur Rahman Khan's massacre of the Shi'i minorities in Afghanistan, the Qizilbash were declared "enemies of the state and were persecuted and hunted by the government and by the Sunni majority.

The former national anthem (2006-2021) of Afghanistan mentioned Qizilbash as an ethnic group in the third line of third stanza.

Bulgaria
Most of the Qizilbash settled in Dobruja in large numbers, either voluntarily or by being deported there from Anatolia by the Ottoman authorities between the 15th and 17th centuries. Kizilbash community are also present in Ludogorie (Deliorman).

The Qizilbash conceal their real identity, outwardly professing to be orthodox Sunnis to their Turkish or Bulgarian neighbours, or alternatively claim to be Bektashis, depending who is addressing them. According to the 1992 census, there were 85,773 Shiites in Bulgaria.

Syria/Lebanon
Between the late seventeenth century and 1822, the term "Qizilbash" was also used in Ottoman administrative documents to identify Twelver (Imami) Shiites in what is today Lebanon. The Ottomans were aware they had no link to the Anatolian or Iranian Qizilbash, employing the term only as a means to delegitimize them or justify punitive campaigns against them. In the early eighteenth century, a part of northern Lebanon is even described as the "Kızılbaş mukataa" tax district.

Turkey

Some contemporary Alevi and Bektashi leaning religious or ethnic minorities in Anatolia are referred to, pejoratively, as Qizilbash.

See also
 Aleviler
 Bektashism and folk religion
 Javanshir Qizilbash
 Mirza Kalich Beg
 Nosairis

Notes

Citations

General sources
 Yves Bomati and Houchang Nahavandi,Shah Abbas, Emperor of Persia,1587–1629, 2017, ed. Ketab Corporation, Los Angeles, English translation by Azizeh Azodi.

Further reading
 
 
 
 

15th century in Iran
History of Turkey
History of Western Asia
Islam-related slurs
Medieval Iranian Azerbaijan
Military history of Safavid Iran
Rebels by type
Shia communities
Turkic words and phrases